The green violetear has been split into the following species:
 Mexican violetear, Colibri thalassinus
 Lesser violetear, Colibri cyanotus

Birds by common name